Indian tribes may refer to:
 Tribe (Native American)
 Adivasi, the tribes of the Republic of India